Cotton Australia (formerly the Australian Cotton Foundation) is an Australian industry trade group representing cotton farmers and corporations in New South Wales and Queensland, Australia

It is a non-profit organisation funded via a voluntary levy of $2.25 per bale of cotton produced by its members.

Cotton Australia lobbies state and national governments regarding cotton industry regulation, pricing and environmental management and maintains an advice and support network for cotton growers on the Australian east coast.

See also
Agriculture in Australia
International Year of Natural Fibres 2009

References

External links 
Cotton Australia official website

Trade associations based in Australia
Cotton organizations
Agricultural organisations based in Australia